English Girl or English Girls may refer to:
The English Girl, novel by Daniel Silva
"English Girls", song by Sarah Brightman from Anything But Lonely
"English Girls", song by The Maine from American Candy
"English Girls", song by Mungo Jerry Ray Dorset	1976
"English Girls", song by Peter Sarstedt Sarstedt	1981